, IAMAS is a public university at Ōgaki, Gifu, Japan, founded in 2001.

External links
Official website

Educational institutions established in 2001
Public universities in Japan
Universities and colleges in Gifu Prefecture
Ōgaki
2001 establishments in Japan